

Republican Period (1889–present)